Lenino is a rural locality (a selo) in Antonovsky Selsoviet of Zavitinsky District, Amur Oblast, Russia. The population was 38 as of 2018. There are 3  streets.

Geography 
Lenino is located 44 km south of Zavitinsk (the district's administrative centre) by road. Raychikhinsk is the nearest rural locality.

References 

Rural localities in Zavitinsky District